The 1974 Cal State Los Angeles Diablos football team represented California State University, Los Angeles as a member of the California Collegiate Athletic Association (CCAA) during the 1974 NCAA Division II football season. Cal State Los Angeles dropped down from NCAA Division I to NCAA Division II competition in 1974, leaving the Pacific Coast Athletic Association (PCAA). Led by fourth-year head coach Jim Williams, who had helmed the team from 1966 to 1968, the Diablos compiled an overall record of 5–4–1 with a mark of 0–3–1 in conference play, placing last out of five teams in the CCAA, although they had the program's first winning season since 1968. The team was outscored 243 to 233 for the season. The Diablos played home games at the Campus Stadium in Los Angeles.

Schedule

References

Cal State Los Angeles
Cal State Los Angeles Diablos football seasons
Cal State Los Angeles Diablos football